NN, Nn, or nn may refer to:

NN/nn, Nynorsk, a Norwegian written language (ISO 639 alpha-1 code "nn"). Sometimes used on websites to distinguish it from its counterpart Bokmål. E.g. nn.wikipedia.org vs no.wikipedia.org.

Businesses and organizations
Nationale-Nederlanden, a Dutch insurance company commonly referred to as NN
 Netroots Nation, a political convention for American progressive activists
 Nevada Northern Railway (reporting mark NN)
 Norilsk Nickel, а metallurgical and mining company
 VIM Airlines (IATA airline designator NN)
 Nigerian Navy, A part of the armed forces of Nigeria

Places
 NN postcode area, UK, for areas of Northamptonshire, England
 Nizhniy Novgorod, a Russian city/major trading center

Science and technology
 Nearest neighbor (disambiguation), with several related uses in mathematics
 Net neutrality, the principle that Internet service providers should treat all data the same
 Neural network, a computing network inspired by biological neural networks
 Normalnull, a German height reference system preceding Normalhöhennull (NHN)
 nn, the chemical symbol for the hypothetical element Neutronium

Other uses
 N. N., a pseudonym of 18th-century Italian priest Camillo Almici
 N. N., pseudonym of Russian economist Sergei Prokopovich
 NN (film), a 2014 Peruvian film
  is a digraph, see 
 Ñ, a letter in Spanish, originally derived from the written "nn"
 Double net lease, a type of lease used for commercial real estate
 Nomen nescio (Latin for "no name"), a person whose name is unknown
NN, the production code for the 1967 Doctor Who serial The Abominable Snowmen
Nick Nurse, head coach of the NBA's Toronto Raptors